Grammoptera is a genus of beetles in the family Cerambycidae, distributed primarily in the Northern Hemisphere.

List of species 

 Grammoptera abdominalis (Stephens, 1831)
 Grammoptera andrei Holzschuh, 1999
 Grammoptera angustata Pic, 1892
 Grammoptera auricollis Mulsant & Rey, 1863
 Grammoptera baudii Sama, 1992
 Grammoptera bipustulata Steiner, 1975
 Grammoptera brezinai (Holzschuh, 1998) 
 Grammoptera cyanea Tamanuki, 1933 
 Grammoptera coerulea Jureček, 1933 
 Grammoptera debilipes (Holzschuh, 1991)
 Grammoptera elongata Pic, 1941 
 Grammoptera exigua (Newman, 1841)
 Grammoptera fulgidipennis Holzschuh, 1991 
 Grammoptera gracilis Brancsik, 1914 
 Grammoptera grammopteroides (Pic, 1892) 
 Grammoptera haematites (Newman, 1841)
 Grammoptera lenis (Holzschuh, 1999) 
 Grammoptera matsudai Hayashi, 1974 
 Grammoptera merkli Frivaldszky, 1884
 Grammoptera militaris (Chevrolat, 1855) 
 Grammoptera molybdica (LeConte, 1850)
 Grammoptera nanella (Wickham, 1914)
 Grammoptera paucula (Holzschuh, 1999) 
 Grammoptera querula Danilevsky, 1993
 Grammoptera rhodopus (LeConte, 1874)
 Grammoptera ruficornis (Fabricius, 1781)
 Grammoptera semimetallica Pic, 1939
 Grammoptera subargentata (Kirby in Richardson, 1837)
 Grammoptera ustulata (Schaller, 1783) 
 Grammoptera viridipennis Pic, 1893

References

Lepturinae